The William Hodgson Two-Family House is or was a historic house at 103-105 Sayles Street in Southbridge, Massachusetts.  The -story Greek Revival duplex was built sometime between 1855 and 1870.  At the time of its listing on the National Register of Historic Places in 1989, it was one of two well-preserved multifamily houses of the period on Sayles Street.  It had a five-bay front facade with projecting gabled porch sheltering the two entrances, corner pilasters, and a frieze across the top of the front, below the gabled roof.  It appears to have been demolished to make way for expansion of the nearby hospital grounds.

See also
National Register of Historic Places listings in Southbridge, Massachusetts
National Register of Historic Places listings in Worcester County, Massachusetts

References

External links
 William Hodgson Two-Family House MACRIS Listing

Houses completed in 1855
Houses in Southbridge, Massachusetts
National Register of Historic Places in Southbridge, Massachusetts
Houses on the National Register of Historic Places in Worcester County, Massachusetts
Greek Revival architecture in Massachusetts